Rettai Jadai Vayasu is a 1997 Indian Tamil-language romantic comedy film directed by C. Sivakumar starring Ajith Kumar and Manthra. Goundamani, Senthil and Ponvannan among others play other pivotal roles in the film, which has music composed by Deva. It was a box office failure.

Plot

Cast 
 Ajith Kumar as Vijay
 Manthra as Anjali
 Goundamani as Vijay's uncle
 Senthil as Pangali
 Latha as Anjali's mother
 Ponvannan as Anjali's brother
K. K. Soundar as Anjali's father
 Ajay Rathnam as Jeeva
Anu Mohan as the bus conductor
 Vijay Krishnaraj as Vijay's father
 Sheela Kaur as Sheela, Jeeva's niece
 Dhaarini as Jeeva's sister
 Neelu Nasreen as Anjali's friend
 Master Adityan

Production 
The film saw the return of C. Sivakumar, who had previously directed the film Ayudha Poojai (1995), and Bhagyam Cine Arts offered him another chance. The film was briefly delayed due to the Film Employees Federation of South India strike of 1997. This was Sivakumar's second and last film as director before his death in August 2018.

Soundtrack 
The soundtrack was composed by Deva.

Reception 
Ji of Kalki wrote .

References

External links 
 

1990s Tamil-language films
1997 films
1997 romantic comedy films
Films scored by Deva (composer)
Indian romantic comedy films